Chattaroy is an unincorporated community in Spokane County, Washington, United States. The town is located on U.S. Route 2 approximately 10 miles north-northeast of Spokane at the confluence of the Little Spokane River and Deer Creek.

Name 
Originally, Chattaroy was named Kidd. Kidd was renamed to Chattaroy at the request of the Great Northern Railroad. There was another town named Kidd (in Montana) that was on the Great Northern Line so the railroad requested a name change to avoid confusion.

Mrs Robert Cowgill and Mrs Alexander B. Owen renamed Kidd to the name of Chattaroy. Chattaroi ( no “y”) was the hero in a novel that these two women were reading at the time. They changed the French spelling of “roi” to “roy”.

History 

Founded in the 1880s, Chattaroy is located two miles east of the defunct Spokane Falls & Northern Railway's Dragoon station.  Residents were buried in the Chattaroy cemetery as early as 1888. A post office called Chattaroy has been in operation since 1888. The origin of the name Chattaroy is obscure.

In 1900 the community consisted of approximately 250 residents, two general stores, Barker's Hotel, a drug store operated by a Dr. Smith, a blacksmith shop, a public school with some 60 students, a Congregational church ministered by Reverend F. McConaughy, a Sunday school, and a Modern Woodmen of America hall.

Climate
This region experiences warm (but not hot) and dry summers, with no average monthly temperatures above 71.6 °F.  According to the Köppen Climate Classification system, Chattaroy has a warm-summer Mediterranean climate, abbreviated "Csb" on climate maps.

References

External links
 Riverside School District

Unincorporated communities in Spokane County, Washington
Unincorporated communities in Washington (state)